The history of rail transport in Angola began during the nineteenth century, when Angola was a colony of Portugal.  It has involved the construction, operation and destruction of four separate, unconnected, coast-to-inland systems, in two different gauges.  Operations on three of those systems have been largely restored; the other system has been closed.

Beginnings

Plans to develop Angola by constructing railway lines existed from 1887.  Two years later, the Luanda Railway (Luanda–Viana–Lucala) was built and opened in the north of the colony, at the initiative of a private railway company.  By 1909, that line had been extended eastwards to Malanje as a state railway.  Later, a branch line was built from Zenza do Itombe to Dondo.

The second significant line, the Moçâmedes Railway, was built as a state railway, in  gauge.  The Moçâmedes Railway connects the port city of Moçâmedes, in the south of the colony, with the inland town of Menongue. In 1910, the first section of this line was opened to traffic.  Other sections were later built to Dongo and Cassinga before the line was completed to Menongue in 1961. A  branch line was built from Lubango to Chiange, making Lubango one of Angola's few rail junctions.  The Moçâmedes Railway was regauged to  gauge in 1950.

Benguela Railway
The Benguela Railway was completed in 1912, to link the two port cities of Lobito and Benguela with Huambo.

By 1929, the line had been extended to Dilolo, now in the Democratic Republic of the Congo, to enable the copper deposits in the Congolese province of Katanga to be transported to the Atlantic ports. Together with other railway lines, this extended line yielded an almost continuous railway route to Dar es Salaam, in what was then Tanganyika. Only two sections on the  route were required to be negotiated by ship.  Later, it was possible to reach the Mozambican port of Beira by rail.

The Benguela Railway proved to be most important railway line in Angola.

Other colonial lines
A fourth railway line to connect the Angolan inland with a port was built in 1925 to serve coffee plantations on Amboim plateau, in  narrow gauge, and linked Porto Amboim with Gabela. Porto Amboim is on the coast between Luanda and Lobito. The Porto Amboim–Gabela line was managed by the Luanda Railway.

Post independence
On 11 November 1975, Angola became independent. By then, the Angolan civil war had already begun.  The civil war lasted until 2002, and brought rail traffic in Angola almost to a standstill. As early as 1975, the Benguela Railway was no longer functional. Several lines, such as the Porto Amboim–Gabela line, were later closed down permanently.

After the end of the civil war, the Angolan government turned to Chinese companies to rehabilitate the three main colonial-era railways. The Luanda Railway and the Benguela Railway were rebuilt by the state-owned China Railway Construction Corporation Limited, while the Moçâmedes Railway was rebuilt by a Chinese mining company.

See also

History of Angola
Rail transport in Angola

References

Notes

Further reading

External links

Angola
Rail
Rail transport in Angola
600 mm gauge railways in Angola

de:Schienenverkehr in Angola#Geschichte